Anolis aliniger, the axillary spotted anole, northern green twig anole, or La Vega anole, is a species of lizard in the family Dactyloidae. The species is endemic to Hispaniola.

References

Anoles
Reptiles described in 1939
Taxa named by Robert Mertens
Endemic fauna of Hispaniola